Máire is the Irish language form of the  Latin Maria, which was in turn a Latin form of the Greek names Μαριαμ, or Mariam, and Μαρια, or Maria, found in the New Testament. Both New Testament names were forms of the Hebrew name  or Miryam
English language name Mary. It was and still is a popular name in Ireland, and is sometimes spelt in its Anglicised forms Maura and Moira. While the diminutive form - Máirín has inspired the anglicised Maureen. Historically, Maol Muire (devotee of Mary) was the reverential form used by the Irish, just as Giolla Phádraig (servant of Pádraig) was the reverential usage for what subsequently became Pádraig. Following the Norman Invasion of Ireland, Máire gradually replaced Maol Muire as a given name, as Pádraig gradually replaced Giolla Phádraig. Its overwhelming popularity was due to the Irish devotion to the Blessed Virgin Mary, but in recent times Irish religious devotion has waned and fewer girls are being named Máire or Mary. 

Completely unrelated to this, Maire is also a female first name in Finland and Estonia.

Religious exception
Due to a very strong devotion of Irish Catholics to the Virgin Mary, a special exception is made for her name. In Irish, she is known as Muire and no one else may take that name similar to the way the name "Jesus" is not used in most languages. A possible exception is the name Máel Muire, used by both men and women, which denotes "Servant of Mary."

People with the given name 
 Maire Aunaste (born 1953), an Estonian journalist
 Máire Breathnach, an Irish actress
 Máire Breatnach, an Irish fiddle player
 Máire Comerford (1892–1982), an Irish republican
 Máire Drumm (1919–1976), the vice president of Sinn Féin and a commander in Cumann na mBan
 Máire Geoghegan-Quinn (born 1950), an Irish politician
 Máire Gill (1891–1977), a political activist
 Maire Gullichsen (1907–1990), Finnish art collector and patronage
 Máire Hendron, Northern Irish politician
 Máire Herbert, Irish historian 
 Máire Hoctor (born 1963), a former Irish Fianna Fáil politician
 Máire Lynch (fl. 1547), a member of the Tribes of Galway
 Máire MacNeill (1904–1987), an Irish journalist, folklorist and translator
 Máire McDonnell-Garvey (1927–2009), traditional Irish musician and writer
 Máire Mhac an tSaoi (born 1922–2021), an Irish language scholar, poet, writer and academic
 Máire Mullarney (1921–2008), an Irish environmentalist, educationalist and Esperanto advocate
 Máire Nic an Bhaird (born 1982), a secondary school teacher and Irish language activist
 Máire Ní Bhraonáin or Moya Brennan, an Irish singer
 Máire Ní Chathasaigh (born 1956), an Irish harpist and singer
 Máire Ní Chinnéide (1879–1967), an Irish language activist, playwright and first President of the Camogie Association
 Máire Ní Ghuairim (1896–1964), an Irish teacher, author and Sean-nós singer
 Máire O'Neill (1885–1952), an Irish actress of stage and film
 Máire O'Neill (academic) (born 1978), an Irish data encryption academic
 Máire Uí Dhroigneáin, an Irish actress
 Máire Whelan, an Irish barrister and senior counsel

Other uses
Máire was the pen name of the Irish author Séamus Ó Grianna

See also
Máiréad, the Irish language form of Margaret (Mairead in Scottish Gaelic)

Given names
Feminine given names
Irish-language feminine given names